Zdeněk Šenkeřík (born 19 December 1980) is a Czech former football striker. His last professional club was Bohemians, who he played for in the Czech 2. Liga. On 19 September 2007, he scored Slavia Prague's first ever UEFA Champions League goal in a match against FC Steaua București that ended in a 2–1 victory.

References

External links

 
 
 Profile at TFF.org

Czech footballers
Czech expatriate footballers
FK Jablonec players
SK Slavia Prague players
FC Fastav Zlín players
FC Baník Ostrava players
Bohemians 1905 players
Malatyaspor footballers
Expatriate footballers in Turkey
Expatriate footballers in Norway
Stabæk Fotball players
Eliteserien players
Czech First League players
Süper Lig players
Sportspeople from Zlín
1980 births
Living people
Czech expatriate sportspeople in Turkey
Czech expatriate sportspeople in Norway
Association football forwards
FK Bohemians Prague (Střížkov) players